Graeme William Cairns (born c.1957) is a New Zealand musician, artist, and political candidate. Originally from Scotland, he is perhaps best known for his role as "Laird McGillicuddy", chief of the Clan McGillicuddy, and as the only-ever leader of the Clan's satirical McGillicuddy Serious political party. At the next election in 1999, when he stood in the  electorate, he was in first rank on the party list. In 2006, he built a toothbrush fence as an absurdist art project.

As a musician, he continues to perform as vocalist, ukulele and bass player in the Big Muffin Serious Band. He is a professional street theatre performer and farms a small holding in the Te Pahu area of the Waikato region.

See also
 McGillycuddy of the Reeks

References

External links 
 There is No Depression in New Zealand
 Frozen Out of the Census

New Zealand musicians
Leaders of political parties in New Zealand
Living people
McGillicuddy Serious Party politicians
Unsuccessful candidates in the 1996 New Zealand general election
Unsuccessful candidates in the 1999 New Zealand general election
Year of birth missing (living people)